Sweden Laundry is a 2014 South Korean television series starring Song Ha-yoon, Changjo and Kim Ian. It aired on MBC Every 1/MBC Dramanet from November 21, 2014, to March 6, 2015, on Fridays at 19:10 for 16 episodes.

Plot 
Middle child Kim Bom (Song Ha-yoon) had a difficult childhood because her mother showered all her affection on Bom's older brother Eun-Chul and her younger sister Eun-sol. Now that Bom is an adult, she runs a laundromat named Sweden Laundry. But she also has the supernatural ability to understand her customers' worries through their laundry. With the help of her employee Yong Soo-Chul, Bom uses this to solve the problems of those around her.

Cast

Main characters 
Song Ha-yoon as Kim Bom
Sassy Kim Bom runs a laundromat, and helps people with her ability to read their worries through their laundry. She communicates with her grandmother through her dreams. She had a crush on Ki-joon, which ended once she found out that he had a girlfriend.
Changjo as Yong Soo-chul
He is 24 years old. He is a young and diligent worker who is in love with Bom. His passion is drawing.
Kim Ian as Park Ki-joon
He is a 27-year-old dentist. He is smart and handsome, and has a girlfriend studying overseas.

Supporting characters 
Hwang Young-hee as Mom
 She is a widow and works hard to make ends meet. She favors her eldest and youngest children.
Oh Sang-jin as Kim Eun-chul
 Brilliant yet unemployed, he studies all day. He later falls in love with Young-mi.
Hwang Seung-eon as Kim Eun-sol
 Eun-sol is an aspiring actress who doesn't get many roles. She is conceited and has a crush on Soo-Chul.
Lee Yong-yi as Granny
 She is deceased and gave Bom the power of reading others' inner thoughts through the laundry.
Bae Noo-ri as Bae Young-mi
 Young-mi has been Bom's best friend since they were in school together. She is a loan shark and is in love with Eun-Chul.
Kim Ji-eun as Yoo Min-Yong
 She is Ki-Joon's girlfriend.

Guest/cameo appearances 
Jung Ji-soon as naive man (ep 2)
Ahn Daniel as Kim Min-ho (ep 5)
Jeon Soo-jin as Hong Bo-hee (ep 6)
Choi Eun-kyung as Young-mi's mother (ep 9)
Byun Ki-soo as cheating husband (ep 10)
Bae Ji-hyun as Han Chae-yeon (ep 10)
Hyun Young as Hae-sook  (ep 12)
Jang Dong-min as Kim Kyung-jin (ep 14–15)

Ratings

Original soundtrack

References

External links 
 Sweden Laundry official MBC Plus website 
 

2014 South Korean television series debuts
2014 South Korean television series endings
MBC TV television dramas
Korean-language television shows
South Korean fantasy television series
South Korean romantic comedy television series